Strictly, a private server is any machine or virtual machine used as a server that is privately administrated. Colloquially the term is nearly-exclusively used to refer to independently operated, unofficial servers for video games.

Private Servers (Broadly Defined) 
As servers need adequate internet connection, power and can be noisy, they are often located in a colocation center. Servers are available on the market the same way as laptops or desktops are available and can be purchased by individual already pre-configured. Ordinary desktop computers are not suitable to house in colocation centers as servers have specific form factor that allows them to fit many into a standard rack. This group also includes custom-designed experimental servers, made by hobbyists  Virtual server also offer high degree of freedom, superuser access and low-cost service.

Private Servers for Video Games 
A private server is a reimplementation in online game servers, typically as clones of proprietary commercial software by a third party of the game community. The private server is often not made or sanctioned by the original company.

Private servers often host MMORPG genre games such as World of Warcraft, Runescape, and MapleStory. These servers can attempt to provide a "stock"/standard experience, or can modify gameplay to change the difficulty, pace of character progress, available content, or available controls over the gameplay environment.

Many private servers encourage players to donate funds for server upkeep. Sometimes these donations are rewarded with in-game benefits. Less commonly, private server operators might sell in-game benefits directly.

Rightsholding companies often attempt to and succeed in shutting down private server versions of their games. Between this and potential for operators to lose interest, private servers can be short-lived. However, there are also cases of games no longer being operated by the rightsholders, in which case a private server may have greater longevity than the sanctioned, defunct service.

Due to how private servers for games are often reverse-engineered and operated using incomplete information about the complete inner workings of the original game, it is common for standard featuresets to be incomplete or for the server to be less stable than an original. On the other hand, it is common for homebrewed features to be added by operators.

References 

Servers (computing)